The Istanbul Basketball League (Turkish: İstanbul Basketbol Ligi) was a regional basketball league competition in Turkey, that was run by the Turkish Basketball Federation from 1926 to 1966. The league lost its first level status after the nationwide Turkish Super League was introduced in the 1966–67 season.

Champions

Performance by club

References

 Atabeyoğlu, Cem. 1453-1991 Türk Spor Tarihi Ansiklopedisi. page(557).(1991) An Grafik Basın Sanayi ve Ticaret AŞ
 Mehmet Durupınar, "Türk Basketbolunun 100 Yıllık Tarihi", İstanbul (2007).
 Archives of Milliyet Newspaper

League 1
 
1927 establishments in Turkey
1966 disestablishments in Turkey
Defunct sports leagues in Turkey
Sports leagues established in 1927